Enric Reyna i Martínez (Barcelona, 1940) is a builder from Barcelona, who was the 37th president of FC Barcelona on 12 February 2003, following the resignation of Joan Gaspart.

Career at FC Barcelona 

Enric Reyna joined the Catalan club's management in 2000 during the period of Joan Gaspart. In December 2002, he became vice president of the club, then President from 12 February 2003. He left his post on 6 May 2003.

References

External links
 Reyna at FC Barcelona website

1940 births
Living people
FC Barcelona presidents
Businesspeople from Catalonia